The Curtiss F6C Hawk was a late 1920s American naval biplane fighter aircraft. It was part of the long line of Curtiss Hawk airplanes built by the Curtiss Aeroplane and Motor Company for the American military.

Originally designed for land-based use, the Model 34C was virtually identical to the P-1 Hawk in United States Army Air Corps service. The United States Navy ordered nine, but starting with the sixth example, they were  strengthened for carrier-borne operations and redesignated Model 34D.

Operators

 VF-9M (US Marines) operated 5 Model 34C, F6C-1 and XF6C-4 from land bases.
 VF-2 (US Navy) operated 4 Model 34D, F6C-2 from 
 VF-5S, later renamed VF-1B (US Navy) along with VF-8M (US Marines) operated 35 Model 34E, F6C-3 from 
 VF-2B (US Navy) operated 31 Model 34H, F6C-4 from Langley

Variants

F6C-1 Model 34C virtually identical to the P-1 series.
F6C-2 Model 34D strengthened for carrierborne operations and fitted with arrester hooks.
F6C-3 Model 34E modified version of the F6C-2.
XF6C-4 Model 34H prototype F6C-1 with a Pratt & Whitney R-1340 Wasp radial engine.
F6C-4 Model 34H production version of the XF6C-4.
F6C-6 Model 34E  modified for racing, with its radiator located inside the fuselage.
XF6C-6 Model 34E the F6C-6 which had won the 1930 Curtiss Marine Trophy was converted to parasol-wing monoplane configuration and given wing surface radiators; after achieving the fastest lap in the 1930 Thompson Trophy race the XF6C-6 crashed when its pilot was overcome by fumes.
XF6C-7 Model 34H testbed for an experimental  Ranger SGV-770C-1 air-cooled inverted Vee engine.

Specifications (F6C-4)

See also

References

Eden, Paul and Soph Moeng. The complete Encyclopedia of World Aircraft. London:Amber Books, 2002.
Swanborough, Gordon and Peter M. Bowers. United States Navy Aircraft since 1911. London:Putnam, Second edition, 1976. .

F06C Hawk
Curtiss F06C
Single-engined tractor aircraft
Biplanes
Aircraft first flown in 1925